is a 1973 Japanese horror film directed by Masashi Matsumoto and produced by Toho. Based on the manga series Wolf Guy, the film's screenplay was co-written by Matsumoto with Jun Fukuda and Shirō Ishimori. It stars Taro Shigaki as Akira Inugami, a young man who transforms into a werewolf by night. He develops a romance with a teacher while opposing a gang leader whose father, a member of the yakuza, murdered Akira's parents years before.

Cast
 Taro Shigaki as Akira Inugami / Wolf Guy
 Yōko Ichiji as Akiko Aoshika (as Masako Aki)
 Michiko Honda as Noriko Kimura
 Yūsaku Matsuda as Dō Haguro
 Toshitaka Itō as Rikiya Kuroda
 Toshio Kurosawa as Akira Jin
 Sayoko Katō as Ryūko Konuma
 Masanobu Sawai as Ōka
 Masao Imanishi as Principal Ōnuki
 Kōichi Hayashi as Vice Principal Morizuka

References

External links
 

Japanese horror films
1973 films
1973 horror films
Werewolf films
1970s Japanese films